The president of the Royal College of Physicians (RCP) is the elected head of the Royal College of Physicians of England, which was founded by letters patent from King Henry VIII in 1518. The president is elected annually late in the year.

Presidents of the Royal College of Physicians 

1518–1524 Thomas Linacre
1526      Thomas Bentley
1527–1528 Richard Bartlot
1529–1530 Thomas Bentley
1531      Richard Bartlot
1541–1543 Edward Wotton
1544      John Clement
1545–1546 William Freeman
1547      John Burgess
1548      Richard Bartlot
1549–1550 John Fryer
1551–1552 
1553–1554 George Owen
1555–1560 John Caius
1561      Richard Masters
1562–1563 John Caius
1564–1567 
1568      Thomas Francis
1569      John Symings
1570      Richard Caldwell
1571      John Caius
1572      John Symings
1581–1584 
1585–1588 Richard Smith
1589–1600 William Baronsdale (died in office)
1600      William Gilbert
1601–1603 Richard Forster
1604–1606 Thomas Langton (died in office)
1606–1608 Henry Atkins
1609–1611 Sir William Paddy
1612–1614 Thomas Moundeford
1615      Richard Forster (died in office)
1616–1617 Henry Atkins
1618      Sir William Paddy
1619      Thomas Moundeford
1620      
1621–1623 Thomas Moundeford
1624      Henry Atkins
1625–1627 John Argent
1628      
1629–1633 John Argent
1634–1640 Simeon Fox
1641–1644 
1645–1650 John Clark
1650–1654 Sir Francis Prujean
1655–1666 Edward Alston
1667–1669 Francis Glisson
1670–1675 Sir George Ent
1676–1681 Sir John Micklethwaite
1682      Thomas Coxe
1683      Daniel Whistler
1684–1687 Sir Thomas Witherley
1688      
1689–1691 Walter Charleton
1692–1693 
1694      John Lawson
1695      Samuel Collins
1696–1703 Sir Thomas Millington (died in office)
1704–1707 Edward Browne (died in office); his replacement Josiah Clerk then stood down because of bad health
1708–1712  (died in office)
1712–1716 William Dawes
1716–1718 John Bateman
1719–1735 Sir Hans Sloane, Bt.
1735–1739 
1740–1745 
1746–1749  (died in office)
1750      James Jurin
1750–1753 
1754–1763 Thomas Reeve
1764      William Battie
1765–1766 Sir William Browne
1767–1774 Thomas Lawrence
1775–1784 William Pitcairn 
1785–1790 Sir George Baker, Bt. 
1791      Thomas Gisborne
1792–1793 Sir George Baker, Bt.
1794      Thomas Gisborne 
1795      Sir George Baker, Bt.
1796–1803 Thomas Gisborne
1804–1810 Sir Lucas Pepys Bt
1811–1812 Sir Francis Milman, Bt.
1813–1819 John Latham
1820–1843 Sir Henry Halford, Bt.
1844–1856 John Ayrton Paris
1857–1861 Thomas Mayo
1862–1866 Sir Thomas Watson, Bt.
1867–1870 Sir James Alderson
1871–1875 Sir George Burrows, 1st Baronet
1876–1880 Sir James Risdon Bennett
1881–1887 Sir William Jenner, Bt.
1888–1892 Sir Andrew Clark, 1st Baronet
1893–1895 Sir John Russell Reynolds, 1st Baronet
1896–1898 Sir Samuel Wilks, Bt.
1899–1904 Sir William Selby Church, Bt.
1905–1909 Sir Richard Douglas Powell, Bt.
1910–1914 Sir Thomas Barlow, 1st Baronet
1915–1917 Sir Frederick Taylor, Bt.
1918–1921 Sir Norman Moore, 1st Baronet
1922–1925 Sir Humphry Rolleston
1926–1930 Sir John Bradford 
1931–1937 The Viscount Dawson of Penn 
1938–1940 Sir Robert Hutchison, 1st Baronet
1941–1949 The Lord Moran
1950–1957 Sir Walter Russell Brain, Bt.
1957–1962 Sir Robert Platt, Bt. (later Lord Platt) 
1962–1966 Sir Edward Charles Dodds, Bt.
1966–1972 Lord Rosenheim of Camden
1972–1977 Sir Cyril Astley Clarke
1977–1983 Sir Douglas Andrew Kilgour Black
1983–1989 Sir Raymond Hoffenberg
1989–1992 Dame Margaret Turner-Warwick DBE
1992–1997 Sir Leslie Arnold Turnberg (later Lord Turnberg)
1997–2002 Sir Kurt George Alberti
2002–2006 Dame Carol M. Black DBE
2006–2010 Sir Ian Gilmore
2010–2014 Sir Richard Thompson KCVO
2014–2018 Dame Jane Dacre DBE
2018–2022 Sir Andrew Goddard
2022–present Sarah Clarke

References
 Roll of the Royal College of Physicians
 Royal College of Physicians

Notes

Royal College of Physicians
Royal College of Physicians

Presidents of the Royal
Presidents of the College of Physicians